α-Humulene synthase (EC 4.2.3.104,ZSS1) is an enzyme with systematic name (2E,6E)-farnesyl-diphosphate diphosphate-lyase (α-humulene-forming). This enzyme catalyses the following chemical reaction:

 (2E,6E)-farnesyl diphosphate  α-humulene + diphosphate

The enzyme from Zingiber zerumbet, shampoo ginger, also gives traces of β-caryophyllene.

References

External links 
 

EC 4.2.3